Theodore Salisbury Woolsey (October 22, 1852 – April 24, 1929) was a United States legal scholar, born at New Haven, Connecticut, son of Theodore Dwight Woolsey.  He graduated at Yale in 1872 and at Yale Law School (1876). In 1872 he was an initiate into The Skull and Bones Society.  After traveling in Europe he was instructor in public law at Yale, and for 33 years (1878-1911) professor of international law.  He was one of the founders of the Yale Review and a frequent contributor to it.  He wrote several essays which were collected under the title America's Foreign policy (1898), and he edited Woolsey's International Law and Pomeroy's International Law.

He was a member of the General Society of Colonial Wars.

Woolsey married Bostonian Annie Gardner Salisbury in 1877 and they had two sons. (One of these sons, Theodore Salisbury Woolsey, Jr., was a forestry expert.) He retired in 1911 and died of pneumonia.

References

Writers from New Haven, Connecticut
American essayists
1852 births
1929 deaths
Woolsey, Theodore
Cornell family
Deaths from pneumonia in the United States
General Society of Colonial Wars
Woolsey family
American legal scholars